Kain Taylor (born 14 October 1967) is a former Australian rules footballer who played for St Kilda in the Victorian/Australian Football League (VFL/AFL).

Recruited from Dingley, Taylor was a utility often used as a tagger. He featured only occasionally in the late 1980s but played a career high 17 games in 1990 and the following year appeared in an Elimination Final against Geelong.

He later played some good football with Springvale, which he captained to premierships in 1996, 1998 and 1999. His performance in the 1996 VFL Grand Final earned him the Norm Goss Memorial Medal.

References

External links
 
 

1967 births
Living people
St Kilda Football Club players
Casey Demons players
Australian rules footballers from Victoria (Australia)